Prasophyllum morganii, commonly known as the Cobungra leek orchid, is a species of orchid endemic to a small area in Victoria. It has a single tubular leaf and up to eighty greenish flowers with purplish markings. Before being rediscovered in 2020, the plant had last been seen in 1933 and was presumed extinct.

Description
The flowers are greenish with purple markings and as with others in the genus, are inverted so that the labellum is above the column rather than below it. The petals are similar in size to the lateral sepals and curve forwards. There is a deep purplish, triangular callus with a V-shaped ridge along the centre of the labellum. Flowering occurs in October and November.

Taxonomy and naming
Prasophyllum morganii was first formally described in 1930 by William Henry Nicholls and the description was published in The Victorian Naturalist from a specimen collected near Cobungra.

Distribution and habitat
Fewer than fifteen plants were known but no plants had been seen since 1933 despite extensive searches in the area. 

In 2000, an orchid similar to P. morganii was collected from Kosciuszko National Park was described by David Jones in the journal The Orchadian and given the name Prasophyllum retroflexum, otherwise known as the Kiandra leek orchid. In 2020, following the Black Summer bushfires, plants collected from north-eastern Victoria and south-western New South Wales were compared with each other, and with herbarium specimens of P. morganii. The study in the journal Phytotaxa concluded that there were no significant differences between the plants collected and the herbarium specimens.

Conservation
Prasophyllum morganii is listed as "vulnerable" under the Commonwealth Government Environment Protection and Biodiversity Conservation Act 1999 (EPBC) Act and is listed as "extinct" in the Victorian Flora and Fauna Guarantee Act 1988.

References

morganii
Flora of Victoria (Australia)
Endemic orchids of Australia
Plants described in 1930